Diocese of Nicosia may refer to:

Roman Catholic Diocese of Nicosia, Sicily
Latin Catholic Archdiocese of Nicosia